BonBon Girls 303 (Chinese: 硬糖少女303 Pinyin: Yìng táng shàonǚ Sān líng sān ) was a Chinese girl group, formed through the 2020 reality show Produce Camp 2020 (Chuang 2020) on Tencent Video. The group consists of seven members: Curley Gao, Zhao Yue, Wang Yijin, Chen Zhuoxuan, Nene/Zheng Naixin, Sally/Liu Xiening and Zhang Yifan. The group officially disbanded on July 4, 2022. 
 
They debuted on July 4, 2020, with the single "BONBON GIRLS". They were managed by Wajijiwa Entertainment.

History

Pre-debut: Produce Camp 2020 

The members participated as one of the 101 trainees in the show Produce Camp 2020 (Chuang 2020) before debuting as members of BonBon Girls 303 on July 4, 2020. Unlike previous seasons who debuted 11 members, the group members have been changed to 7 members. The final group includes members from different companies: Curley Gao, Zhao Yue, Wang Yijin, Chen Zhuoxuan, Nene/Zheng Naixin, Liu Xiening, and Zhang Yifan.

2020–2022: Debut with The Law of Hard Candy, Fearless Girls, and Bonbon Voyage 
The group released their first EP The Law of Hard Candy (硬糖定律) and its lead single "BONBON GIRLS" on August 11, 2020.

The group released their second EP Fearless Girls (了不起的女孩) and its lead single "SLAY and PLAY" on April 27, 2021.

The group released their third EP BonBon Voyage (别怕，未来会来) and its lead single "Me And My Girls" on May 20, 2022.

The group officially disbanded on July 4, 2022 after 2 years of promotions.

Members 
 Curley/Xilinnayi Gao (希林娜依·高/شىرىناي گاو)
 Akira/Zhao Yue (赵粤)
 Rita/Wang Yijin (王艺瑾)
 Krystal/Chen Zhuoxuan (陈卓璇)
 Nene/Zheng Naixin (郑乃馨, พรนับพัน พรเพ็ญพิพัฒน์ / Pornnappan Pornpenpipat) 
 Sally/Liu Xiening (刘些宁) 
 Emily/Zhang Yifan (张艺凡)

Discography

Extended plays

Singles

Soundtrack appearances

Filmography

Reality Shows

References

External links 
 
  

 
Chinese girl groups
Mandopop musical groups
Chinese pop music groups
Chinese dance music groups
Mandarin-language singers
Produce 101
Produce 101 (Chinese TV series) contestants
Musical groups established in 2020
2020 establishments in China
2022 disestablishments in China
Musical groups disestablished in 2022
Reality show winners